This is a list of country subdivisions named after people. It details the name of the country subdivision and eponym. The etymology is generally referenced in the article about the person or the administrative division.

This is a summary from List of etymologies of country subdivision names.

Australia
Jervis Bay TerritoryJohn Jervis, 1st Earl of St Vincent
QueenslandQueen Victoria
TasmaniaAbel Tasman
VictoriaQueen Victoria

Bermuda
Devonshire ParishWilliam Cavendish, 1st Earl of Devonshire
Hamilton ParishJames Hamilton, 2nd Marquess of Hamilton
Paget ParishWilliam Paget, 4th Baron Paget de Beaudesert
Pembroke ParishWilliam Herbert, 3rd Earl of Pembroke
St. George's ParishSt. George
Sandys ParishSir Edwin Sandys
Smith's ParishSir Thomas Smith (English aristocrat)
Southampton ParishHenry Wriothesley, 3rd Earl of Southampton
Warwick ParishRobert Rich, 2nd Earl of Warwick

Brazil
RondôniaMarshal Cândido Rondon
Santa CatarinaSaint Catherine
São PauloSaint Paul

Canada
This is a summary of Canadian provincial name etymologies.

AlbertaPrincess Louise Caroline Alberta, fourth daughter of Queen Victoria
British ColumbiaChristopher Columbus (-> Columbia, an American sailing ship -> Columbia River -> Columbia Territory of Hudson's Bay Company -> British Columbia)
Prince Edward IslandPrince Edward, Duke of Kent (brother of George III of the United Kingdom), commander of British forces in Halifax,  Nova Scotia

Chile
Santiago Metropolitan RegionSaint James the Greater
O'Higgins RegionBernardo O'Higgins
Aisén (region)Carlos Ibáñez del Campo (officially, Aysén del General Carlos Ibáñez del Campo Region)
Magallanes RegionFerdinand Magellan

Colombia
BogotáBacatáan indigenous cacique (emperor)
Bolívar DepartmentSimón Bolívar
Caldas DepartmentFrancisco José de Caldas
Nariño DepartmentAntonio Nariño
Norte de Santander DepartmentFrancisco de Paula Santander
Santander DepartmentFrancisco de Paula Santander
Sucre DepartmentAntonio José de Sucre
Córdoba DepartmentJosé María Córdoba

Dominican Republic
DuarteJuan Pablo Duarte
EspaillatUlises Francisco Espaillat (author and president)
María Trinidad SánchezMaría Trinidad Sánchez (female soldier)
Monseñor NouelMonseñor Dr. Adolfo Alejandro Nouel y Bobadilla (archbishop and president)
Sánchez RamírezBrigadier Juan Sánchez Ramírez

Ecuador
BolívarSimón Bolívar

Estonia
Valgafrom German family names de Walco or de Walko.

France
Adélie LandAdélie, wife of Jules Dumont d'Urville
Kerguelen IslandsYves-Joseph de Kerguelen-Trémarec
Lorraine (formerly Lotharingia)Lothar
Saint-Pierre and MiquelonSt. Peter
Wallis and FutunaSamuel Wallis

Ireland
County KilkennyCainnech of Aghaboe
County OffalyFailge Berraide
County RoscommonComan mac Faelchon
County TyroneEógan mac Néill

Italy
Aosta ValleyAugustus
Emilia-RomagnaMarcus Aemilius Lepidus (consul 187 BC)
Friuli Venezia GiuliaJulius Caesar

Jamaica
 Clarendon ParishEdward Hyde, 1st Earl of Clarendon
 Hanover ParishGeorge I of Great Britain, of the House of Hanover
 Saint Ann ParishLady Anne Hyde (first wife of James II of England)
 Saint Elizabeth ParishElizabeth Modyford (wife of Sir Thomas Modyford, 1st Baronet, the first English colonial governor of Jamaica)
 Saint James ParishJames II of England
 Trelawny ParishSir William Trelawny, 6th Baronet

Malaysia
 PutrajayaTunku Abdul Rahman

Mexico
Ciudad JuarezBenito Juárez
GuerreroVicente Guerrero
HidalgoMiguel Hidalgo
MorelosJosé María Morelos
Quintana RooAndrés Quintana Roo
Veracruz-LlaveIgnacio de la Llave

New Zealand
AucklandEarl of Auckland
Cook IslandsCaptain James Cook
D'Urville IslandJules Dumont d'Urville
Tasman DistrictAbel Tasman

Norway
Jan MayenJan Jacobszoon May van Schellinkhout
Queen Maud LandQueen Maud of Norway

Papua New Guinea
Bougainville – Louis Antoine de Bougainville

Paraguay
Presidente HayesPresident Rutherford B. Hayes of the United States

Philippines
This is a summary of Philippine provincial name etymologies.

AuroraAurora Aragon Quezon
IsabelaQueen Isabella II of Spain 
QuezonManuel Luis Quezon
QuirinoElpidio Quirino
RizalJosé Rizal
Sultan KudaratMuhammad Kudarat

Romania
This is a summary from Etymological list of counties of Romania

Bessarabiafrom Basarab I

Russia

Kaliningrad OblastMikhail Kalinin
Khabarovsk KraiYerofey Khabarov
Kirov OblastSergey Kirov
Leningrad OblastVladimir Lenin
Saint PetersburgPeter the Great
Sverdlovsk OblastYakov Sverdlov
Ulyanovsk OblastVladimir Lenin
Vladimir OblastVladimir the Great
Yaroslavl OblastYaroslav the Wise

United Kingdom
AngleseyOngull, a Scandinavian landowner
AngusKing Oengus I of the Picts
BedfordshireBieda, a Saxon landowner ("Bieda's ford" + shire)
BrecknockshirePrince Brychan
BuckinghamshireBucca, a Saxon landowner ("Bucca's home" + shire)
CardiganCeredig, son of Cunedda
FifeFib of the Picts, one of the seven sons of Cruithe
GlamorganPrince Morgan the Old of Gwent
GwyneddCunedda
HampshireHamo, a 6th-century Saxon settler and landowner
KirkcudbrightSaint Cuthbert ("church of Cuthbert")
LothianLeudonus
MerionethshireMeirion, son of Cunedda
Montgomery, PowysRoger de Montgomery
NottinghamshireSnot, a Saxon landowner ("Snot's home" + shire)
RoxburghshireHroc, an ancient landowner ("Hroc's fortress" + shire)
RutlandRota, a Saxon landowner ("Rota's land")

Dependencies

 GibraltarArabic Jabal Tāriq (جبل طارق), meaning "mountain of Tariq", because Tariq ibn-Ziyad, the militar leader of the Muslim invasion of Spain in 711, landed there from Africa

United States
This is a summary from List of U.S. state name etymologies.

DelawareThomas West, 3rd Baron De La Warr
District of ColumbiaChristopher Columbus
GeorgiaKing George I of Great Britain
LouisianaKing Louis XIV of France
MarylandHenrietta Maria of France, wife of Charles I
New YorkJames Stuart, Duke of York (later James II of England)
Northern Mariana IslandsMariana of Austria, Queen of Spain
North Carolina and South CarolinaKing Charles I of England
PennsylvaniaAdmiral Sir William Penn
Virginia and West VirginiaQueen Elizabeth I of England, the "Virgin Queen"
WashingtonGeorge Washington

Related lists:
List of U.S. counties named after women
Lists of U.S. county name etymologies

Uruguay
ArtigasJosé Artigas
FloresVenancio Flores

Venezuela
AnzoáteguiJosé Antonio Anzoátegui
BolívarSimón Bolívar
FalcónJuan Crisóstomo Falcón
MirandaFrancisco de Miranda
MonagasJosé Tadeo Monagas
SucreAntonio José de Sucre
VargasJosé María Vargas

See also
List of etymologies of country subdivision names
List of eponyms
List of places named after people

 Named after people
Country subdivisions